Jurkova Voľa is a village and municipality in the Svidník District in the Prešov Region of north-eastern Slovakia.

History
Historical records of the village were first mentioned in 1600.

Geography
The municipality lies at an altitude of 304 metres and covers an area of 7.412 km². It has a population of about 75 people.

Genealogical resources
The records for genealogical research are available at the state archive "Statny Archiv in Presov, Slovakia".

 Greek Catholic church records (births/marriages/deaths): 1835-1900 (parish B)

See also
 List of municipalities and towns in Slovakia

References

External links
 
https://web.archive.org/web/20080111223415/http://www.statistics.sk/mosmis/eng/run.html
Surnames of living people in Jurkova Vola

Villages and municipalities in Svidník District
Šariš